Brecha is a Uruguayan weekly newspaper.

History
Founded in 1985 by Hugo Alfaro and other journalists that had started their careers at Marcha under the influence of Carlos Quijano. As Quijano had died in 1984 in exile, they decided to take a new name, and try to continue with the original idea: an independent leftist weekly newspaper.

Together with Búsqueda, it is considered one of the two most influential political weekly newspapers in Uruguay.

References

Newspapers established in 1985
1985 establishments in Uruguay
Newspapers published in Uruguay
Spanish-language newspapers
Mass media in Montevideo